The Fear is a single by Mike Paradinas released in 1999 under his pseudonym µ-Ziq. It only contains three four-and-a-half minute tracks, the title track being from the 1999 album Royal Astronomy.

Track listing 

 "The Fear (remix)" - 4.58
 "Houzz 8" - 4.31
 "Morning Frolic" - 4.11

Some editions had the album version of The Fear as track one and the remix as track 4.

References

Mike Paradinas albums